Muccioli is an Italian surname. Notable people with the surname include:

Anna Maria Muccioli (born 1964), Sammarinese politician
Claudio Muccioli (born 1958), Sammarinese politician
Dalia Muccioli (born 1993), Italian cyclist
Giulio Muccioli, Pharmacologist and bioanalyst
Krystal Muccioli (born 1989), American beauty pageant winner
Riccardo Muccioli (born 1974), Sammarinese footballer
Simona Muccioli (born 1984), Sammarinese swimmer
Stefano Muccioli (born 1968), Sammarinese footballer

Italian-language surnames